Twins' Love is an EP by the Cantopop group Twins.  Since the first EP Twins (AVEP) was a great success, the Twins released this second CD just 3 months later, in November 2001. It contained 8 songs and 1 music video, "Oi Ching Dong Yap Jun" (愛情當入樽).

CD Content
Computer Data Not Playable   
Computer Data Not Playable   
"Oi Ching Dong Yap Jun" (愛情當入樽) - (熱播主打) ( Slam Dunking Love)       
"Hok Saang Sau Chaak" (學生手冊) (Student Handbook)
"Luen Oi Daai Gwoh Tin" (戀愛大過天) - (接力推介) (Love Bigger Than Sky)  
"Fei Sin" (飛線) (Forwarded Call)
"Woh Ping Yat" (和平日) (Peaceful Day)
"Yau Soh Bat Ji" (有所不知) - (Disney卡通"Marie"主題曲) (The theme song of the Disney cartoon Marie) (There's Something You Don't Know)  
"Oi Ching Dong Yap Jun" (愛情當入樽) - (熱播主打) (Air Mix) (Slam Dunking Love)
"Woh Ping Yat" (和平日) (We Mix) (The theme song of Fun Fun Show 01) (Peaceful Day)
"Nui Haau Naam Sang" (女校男生) - (人氣焦點主打) (Back to School Mix) (Girls` School, Male Student)

2001 EPs
Twins (group) EPs